Trio Dhoore is a Belgian Flemish instrumental folk band composed of brothers Ward, Hartwin, and Koen Dhoore.

History
The brothers grew up playing music together, starting around age 10. They formed the trio in 2010.

Musical style

Chris Nickson of RootsWorld writes that the band has "grown into a central part of the European instrumental movement, influenced but not completely consumed by their native traditions". Peter Thelen of Exposé writes that "their music is a beautifully crafted collection of strongly melodic pieces that are at once warm, tempered and powerful, with every player an essential element of their sound". Irish Music Magazine writes that "if you are new to Flemish music Trio Dhoore is at its cutting edge and well worth discovering". Alex Gallacher of Folk Radio UK writes that "the intuitive musicianship between the brothers is quite magical", and that they create "beautiful soundscapes" which "breathe new life into traditional Flemish music".

Band members

 Koen Dhoore – Hurdy-Gurdy
 Hartwin Dhoore – Accordion
 Ward Dhoore – Guitar

Discography
 Modus Operandi (2013)
 Parachute (2015)
 Momentum (2016)
 August (2019)

References

External links
 
 

Belgian folk music groups
Musical groups established in 2010
Belgian musical trios
2010 establishments in Belgium